Morgan Maunoir (born 7 January 1993) is a French lightweight rower. He won a gold medal at the 2015 World Rowing Championships in Aiguebelette with the lightweight men's quadruple scull.

References

1993 births
Living people
French male rowers
World Rowing Championships medalists for France